Leptoscyphus is a genus of liverwort in family Lophocoleaceae. It contains the following species (but this list may be incomplete):

 Leptoscyphus azoricus (Buch & Perss.) Grolle

Jungermanniales
Jungermanniales genera
Taxonomy articles created by Polbot